Route 12 is a short highway in the Kansas City metropolitan area.  Its eastern terminus is at Spring Street in Independence.  Its western terminus is at Interstate 435 at the eastern edge of Kansas City. The highway is known as Truman Road in Independence, Missouri and passes by the home of Harry S. Truman.

Major intersections

References

012
Transportation in Jackson County, Missouri